The Chadian Ground Forces are the main and largest component of the Chadian National Army (Armée nationale tchadienne). Historically Chad has had one of the strongest armies in the Sahara region, larger than the Malian or Central African army, with a total of 25,000 to 30,000 troops. Chad has been involved as part of the Multinational Joint Task Force in fighting the Boko Haram insurgency, deploying troops to Niger and Mali. Another common role of the Chadian Army has been quelling rebellions against the central government of Chad.

Structure

 Defense and Security Zone
 No. 1 (Fada)
 No. 2 (Ouaddaï)
 No. 3
 No. 4
 No. 5
 No. 6 (Bardaï)
 No. 7 (Faya-Largeau)
 No. 8 (Amdjarass)

Armored Battalion
Infantry Battalion
Artillery Battalion
Engineer Battalion
Special Forces Unit
Rapid Intervention Force (FIR)

Equipment

Small arms

Anti-tank weapons

Anti-aircraft weapons

Artillery

Armoured vehicles

References

Military of Chad